The Alexandria Center of Arts (Alexandria Center for Creativity) is an arts center, community exhibitions space and cultural center in the city of Alexandria, Egypt, overseen by the Egyptian Ministry of Culture. The center was officially opened on 29 October 2001, by Farouk Hosni, Minister of Culture, and then-President Hosni Mubarak's wife, Suzanne Mubarak.

External links
 Alexandria Center of Arts website 

Buildings and structures in Alexandria
Arts centres in Egypt
Event venues established in 2001
2001 establishments in Egypt
21st-century architecture in Egypt